Dr AllahDad Bohyo was born on 8 August 1934 in village Ghoghari , Larkana District, Sindh. He was a known writer, educationist, scholar, linguist and poet. He died on 16 July 1994.

Education
He did Master of Arts in English and Bachelor of Teaching. He got PhD degree in 1977 under the supervision of Ghulam Ali Allana from University of Sindh. The topic of his research article was "Sindhi Boli jo Samaji Karaj" .

Professional career
Dr. AllahDad Bohyo started his practical life as a teacher in 1957. Later on he was promoted as director of education and remained on this post till the last days of his life. Dr. Bohyo is known as literary circle with his criticism and linguistic qualities. He worked his whole life for the promotion of language and literature, his favorite fields were research and he took a deep interest in social linguistics.

Publications
His PhD thesis was published by Institute of Sindhology in 1978. His articles and essays have been published in different periodicals and newspapers. He has also written some books on research and criticism. It includes "Tanqeedaan" in 1980. Adab ja fikri moharik in 1984 and Ilm Tahkqee in 1970. Dr. Bohyo has compiled a book on poetry named "Chonday  kano Kano " but so far it has not published.

Death
He died on 16 July 1994 from a heart attack while he was addressing a Seminar at Tando Adam, Sindh.

References

Sindhi people
Pakistani writers
Pakistani scholars
Pakistani Sindhologists
1934 births
1994 deaths
Sindhi-language writers
Pakistani lexicographers
20th-century lexicographers